Wikstroemia bicornuta, the alpine false ohelo, is a species of flowering plant in the mezereon family, Thymelaeaceae, that is endemic to Hawaii. It is threatened by habitat loss.

References

bicornuta
Endemic flora of Hawaii
Biota of Lanai
Biota of Maui
Taxonomy articles created by Polbot